The Beta is a right tributary of the river Olt in Romania. It discharges into the Olt in Ciba, part of Miercurea Ciuc.

References

Rivers of Romania
Rivers of Harghita County